Arscott is a surname. Notable people with the surname include:

Caroline Arscott, historian of art
David Arscott, BBC radio presenter, and local historian
Felix Arscott, English mathematician
John Arscott (1613–1675), English landowner
Jonathan Arscott, English cricketer
Luke Arscott, rugby player
Nicky Arscott, British poet and artist
Tom Arscott, rugby player
Vanessa Arscott, murder victim
Arscott of Tetcott, an English family, of Tetcott, Devon